Sindak is a 1999 Philippine thriller film directed by Mario O'Hara. The film stars John Rendez (who produced the film under his real name), William Martinez and Gardo Versoza.

Cast
 John Rendez as Mulong
 William Martinez as Terry
 Gardo Versoza as Raul
 Rita Magdelena as Susan
 Aya Medel as Cora
 Mike Magat as Ed
 Allen Dizon as Lar
 Maria Isabel Lopez as Ballikbayan
 Carlos Morales as Photographer
 Edwin O'Hara as Rabago
 Mon Confiado as Ed's Co-guard
 Dennis Coronel as Mando
 Dante Belen as Cora's Father
 Josie Tagle as Matrona
 Eugene Domingo as Eatery Owner
 Rina Rosal as Pick-up Girl
 Olga Natividad as Mulong's 1st Victim
 Lawrence Roxas as Dennis
 Janice Mendoza as Emma
 Joel Masilungan as Baliw
 Gilbert Onida as Investigator
 Koko Teodoro as Catographer
 Paolo O'Hara as Terry's Co-guard
 Evelyn Camasura as Terry's Aunt
 Cris Maruso as Matrona's Boyfriend
 Nemie Samson as Guy in Film Center
 Max Paglinawan as Ed's Father
 Anna Rose Bautista as Policewoman
 Trixie Alcazar as Mulong's Girlfriend
 Japh Bahian as Prisoner
 Jeff San Juan as Hunting Guide
 Jerson Ramos as Hunting Guide
 Edwin Amado as Ed's Co-guard

Production
Director Mario O'Hara dropped out in the middle of the film's post-production reportedly due to creative differences.

References

External links

1999 films
1999 thriller films
Filipino-language films
Philippine thriller films
Crown Seven films
Films directed by Mario O'Hara